Kao Ching-yuen (24 May 1929 – March 2016, aged 86) was a Taiwanese businessman. Kao was born to a poor family in Gakkō Village, Hokumon District, Tainan Prefecture, Japanese-era Taiwan (modern-day Syuejia, Tainan). Kao began working upon graduating from elementary school. He got into Taiwan Spinning (台南紡織), a textile processing company in 1954, and became a manager later. Kao left Taiwan Spinning in 1966.

He established the Uni-President Corporation in 1967 and served as company chairman until 2013.

In 1997, he was awarded an Honorary Doctor of Management from National Sun Yat-sen University (NSYSU).

In 2003 he was awarded a Management Medal by the Chinese Management Association. Kao's death was confirmed by Uni-President on 1 April 2016, and a funeral was held the same day.

References

1929 births
2016 deaths
Businesspeople from Tainan
20th-century Taiwanese businesspeople